Brent James McIntosh is an American attorney who served as Under Secretary of the Treasury for International Affairs from 2017 to 2019. He previously served as General Counsel of the United States Treasury. Prior to his government service, McIntosh was a partner at Sullivan & Cromwell and served as co-head of the firm's cybersecurity practice.

Early life and education 
McIntosh was born in Lansing, Michigan, and raised in Williamston. His mother is a retired teacher, and his father is the founder of McNeer Company, a structural engineering firm based in Williamston.

McIntosh received his undergraduate degree from the University of Michigan and his J.D. from Yale Law School. He served as a law clerk to Judge Dennis Jacobs of the United States Court of Appeals for the Second Circuit and Judge Laurence Silberman of the United States Court of Appeals for the District of Columbia Circuit.

Career 
From 2004 to 2006, he worked at the Office of Legal Policy at the United States Department of Justice, serving in part as a deputy assistant attorney general. He was an associate counsel to President George W. Bush from 2006 to 2009, as well as a deputy assistant to the president and deputy staff secretary.

In May 2019, President Trump nominated McIntosh to be Under Secretary of the Treasury for International Affairs. The U.S. Senate confirmed him on September 18, 2019, by a vote of 54–38. In March 2020, he was the Treasury Department official overseeing several programs providing unprecedented financial assistance to the U.S. airline industry during the COVID-19 pandemic.

Following his stint at Treasury, McIntosh joined the Council on Foreign Relations as an adjunct senior fellow for international economics and finance.

McIntosh is a member of the International Institute for Strategic Studies, the Alexander Hamilton Society, the American Society of International Law, the Bretton Woods Committee, and the Federalist Society. He was previously a member of the Council on Foreign Relations. The New York Law Journal named him a "rising star" in 2013.

Personal life 
In 2001, McIntosh married Laura Ahn, an attorney. The two met at Yale Law School, where Ahn was the editor of the Yale Law Journal and McIntosh was an articles editor. Ahn worked as an associate at Wachtell, Lipton, Rosen & Katz, and now serves as a consulting attorney for the firm, specializing in corporate law.

References

External links
 Biography at Sullivan & Cromwell LLP
 Biography at U.S. Department of the Treasury

Living people
1973 births
University of Michigan alumni
Yale Law School alumni
21st-century American lawyers
Federalist Society members
United States Department of the Treasury officials
Trump administration personnel
Sullivan & Cromwell partners
People from Lansing, Michigan